Roxita spinosa is a moth in the family Crambidae. It was described by W. Li in 2011. It is found in China (Hainan).

References

Crambinae
Moths described in 2011